Boeny is a region in northwestern Madagascar. It borders Sofia Region to the northeast, Betsiboka to the south and Melaky to the southwest. The capital of the region is Mahajanga, and the population was 931,171 in 2018.

Administrative divisions
Boeny Region is divided into six districts, which are sub-divided into 43 communes.

 Ambato-Boeni District - 11 communes
 Mahajanga I District - 1 commune
 Mahajanga II District - 5 communes
 Marovoay District - 12 communes
 Mitsinjo District - 7 communes
 Soalala District - 3 communes

Transport

Airports
Mahajanga Airport
Soalala Airport

Protected areas
Mahavavy-Kinkony Wetland Complex
Bombetoka Beloboka New Protected Area
Antrema New Protected Area
Ankarafantsika National Park
Baie de Baly National Park
Tsingy de Namoroka National Park

See also
Boina Kingdom

References

 
Regions of Madagascar